In telecommunication, the term connections per circuit hour (CCH) has the following meanings: 
A unit of teletraffic measurement expressed as the number of connections established at a switching point per hour.
A unit of traffic measurement used to express the rate at which circuits are established at a switch.

The magnitude of the CCH is an instantaneous value subject to change as a function of time (i.e. from moment to moment), and is subject to study including load curve and busy hour as other measures of traffic are.

See also
Busy Hour Call Attempts

References

Teletraffic